Pontixanthobacter aquaemixtae  is a Gram-negative, aerobic and non-motile bacterium from the genus Pontixanthobacter.

References

External links
Type strain of Altererythrobacter aquaemixtae at BacDive -  the Bacterial Diversity Metadatabase

Sphingomonadales
Bacteria described in 2017